The R547 is a Regional Route in South Africa.

Route
Its northern terminus is an intersection with the R555 just south-west of Witbank, Mpumalanga. It leaves in a south-easterly direction, going over the N12 (without intersecting it), through Coalville, to a four-way intersection. The road heading south-east becomes signed the R544, and the road to the south-west the R547. From that intersection the R547 passes through Kriel and here meets the R545 at a staggered intersection. Continuing south-west, it intersects with the northern terminus of the R580 before reaching Kinross. Here it crosses the R29, thereafter being cosigned briefly with the R546. They diverge just before meeting the N17, with the R547 again heading south-west. It crosses the R50 at a staggered junction, before reaching its southern terminus at an intersection with the R23 between Greylingstad and Standerton.

References

Regional Routes in Mpumalanga